Following the defeat of Nazi Germany and then the partition of German territory, two Four-Power Authorities, in which the four main victor nations (the United States, the United Kingdom, the Soviet Union and France) managed equally, were created.

The intended governing body of Germany until it could run itself was called the Allied Control Council. The commanders-in-chief exercised supreme authority in their respective zones and acted in concert on questions affecting the whole country. The capital Berlin, which lay in the Soviet sector, was also divided into four sectors.

Only two jointly run four-power organizations survived the division of Germany. Both were in West Berlin, Germany, and existed during the Cold War from 1948 to 1989.  These were the Berlin Air Safety Center and Spandau Prison (which was demolished in 1987 when  Rudolf Hess, the sole remaining prisoner, died).

Status
These two organizations were uniquely four-powered in that American, British, French, and Soviet authorities cooperated in their management. This was different from the intensely adversarial relations the allies had with the Warsaw Pact leader in almost every other aspect of world affairs during this time. Both organizations remained low-profile and secretive during their existences to avoid highlighting the politically sensitive nature of their interactions and cooperations.

See also
 Four Power (disambiguation)
 Four Power Naval Commission
 Four Power Agreement on Berlin 
 Council of Foreign Ministers
 European Advisory Commission
 Treaty on the Final Settlement With Respect to Germany
 History of Germany since 1945

Aftermath of World War II in Germany
Allied occupation of Germany
France–United Kingdom military relations
France–United States military relations
France–Soviet Union relations
Soviet Union–United Kingdom relations
Soviet Union–United States relations
United Kingdom–United States military relations